Daniel Blumenthal (born September 23, 1952) is a German-born American pianist.

Daniel Blumenthal is Professor at the Royal Conservatory of Music in Brussels, and of the Thy Masterclass Chamber Music Festival in Denmark. He has served on the jury of the Queen Elisabeth Competition for Piano and the Paris Conservatory. He is an honorary member and musical advisor of Icons of Europe, Brussels.

Daniel Blumenthal was born to Rivkah Blumenthal (Nee Goldin, born Gomel, Belarus 1923) and Col. Peter J. Blumenthal, U.S. Army (born Berlin 1921) in Landstuhl, Germany on September 23, 1952. He began his musical studies in Paris at 5 years of age, was graduated from the University of Michigan with a Bachelor of Music in Piano Performance, and earned both a Master of Music  and Doctor of Musical Arts degree from the Juilliard School in New York City.

Career

Blumenthal enjoys a career of acclaimed performances on five continents and award winning recordings. In Europe, he has performed concerti with such distinguished orchestras as the London Symphony Orchestra, the Royal Liverpool Orchestra, the Dutch Radio Orchestra, the English Chamber Orchestra, the Flanders Philharmonic, the National Orchestra of Belgium, and the L’Orchestre du Capitole in Toulouse, to name a few.  In addition to his concerto performances, Blumenthal has been presented by the Chopin Society in Paris, and has performed numerous recitals in Amsterdam’s Concertgebouw, the Théâtre des Champs-Elysées, and the Teatro della Pergola in Florence.  He has performed in all of the major concert halls in London, including three highly acclaimed recitals at the Queen Elizabeth Hall.

U.S. concerto performances have included appearances with the Atlanta, Dallas, North Carolina, Boise, Maryland, Flint and Utah Symphonies, as well as a televised performance as soloist with the Houston Symphony.  Carnegie Hall has presented Blumenthal on three occasions.  Other American recital credits include Tanglewood, Yale University, The Phillips Collection in Washington, D.C., the Today’s Artists Series in San Francisco, the Frick Collection, Bargemusic in New York, Community Concert Tours, and a performance at Lincoln Center supported by a grant from the Martha Baird Rockefeller Fund for Music.

In 1993 Blumenthal made his Latin American debut in three recitals at the Festival Internacional Cervantino in Guanajuato, Mexico.  He returned to Mexico in 1995 for his debut with the National Orchestra of Mexico in Bartok’s 2nd Piano Concerto.  He made is Swedish debut in June 1996 in an opening night gala recital of the Kils Piano Festival, followed by a performance of the Schumann Concerto for the Swedish Early Summer Music Days in Karlstadt.

Blumenthal’s career extends to Australia and Southeast Asia, where he has performed three lengthy tours.  In addition to numerous solo recitals and chamber music performances, he appeared as soloist with the Adelaide Chamber Orchestra and was Performer-in-Residence at the University of Adelaide for two seasons.

Blumenthal enjoys an active career performing joint recitals.  He collaborates with such renowned artists as violinists Peter Zazofsky and Pierre Amoyal, Barry Tuckwell, bass-baritone Jose Van Dam, tenor John Aler, soprano Dinah Bryant, contralto Marie-Nicole Lemieux, and the Orlando, Enesco, and Colorado String Quartets.  Blumenthal is an annual participant in the Thy Chamber Music Festival in the north of Denmark. He was a regular performing member of the acclaimed Spectrum Concerts in Berlin from 1999-2008.

Awards
Blumenthal has won prizes in several competitions, including the Sydney International Piano Competition, (1981, 4th prize and winner of the Musica Viva Chamber Music prize); the Leeds International Piano Competition, (1981, 4th prize); the Geneva International Music Competition, (1982, 2nd prize); the Busoni Competition (1982, 3rd prize), and the Queen Elisabeth Music Competition, (1983, 4th prize).

Discography
With an impressive discography of more than eighty solo and chamber music releases,  Blumenthal can be heard on EMI, Calliope, Autographe, Naïve, Cyprés, Ambroisie, ADDA, Reader’s Digest, Cybelia, Phonic, Marco Polo, Naxos, Etectera, Musique en Wallonie, and Fuga Libera.

External links
www.bach-cantatas.com/Bio/Blumenthal-Daniel.htm
[ www.allmusic.com/cg/amg.dll?p=amg&sql=41:13713~T1]
www.naxos.com/artistinfo/Daniel_Blumenthal/76.htm

References

1952 births
Living people
German classical pianists
Juilliard School alumni
University of Michigan School of Music, Theatre & Dance alumni
Royal Conservatory of Brussels alumni
Academic staff of the Royal Conservatory of Brussels
Prize-winners of the Ferruccio Busoni International Piano Competition
Sydney International Piano Competition prize-winners
Prize-winners of the Leeds International Pianoforte Competition
Prize-winners of the Queen Elisabeth Competition
20th-century American pianists
American male pianists
21st-century American pianists
20th-century American male musicians
21st-century American male musicians